Chicago Landmark is a designation by the Mayor and the City Council of Chicago for historic sites in Chicago, Illinois, United States. Listed sites are selected after meeting a combination of criteria, including historical, economic, architectural, artistic, cultural, and social values. Once a site is designated as a landmark, it is subject to the Chicago Landmarks Ordinance, which requires that any alterations beyond routine maintenance, up to and including demolition, must have their permit reviewed by the Landmarks Commission. Many Chicago Landmarks are also listed on the National Register of Historic Places, providing federal tax support for preservation, and some are further designated National Historic Landmarks, providing additional federal oversight.

Criteria 
The Mayor and the City Council appoint a nine-member Commission on Chicago Landmarks to develop landmark recommendations in accordance with a 1968 Chicago city ordinance. The commission considers areas, districts, places, buildings, structures, works of art, and other objects within the City of Chicago for nomination based solely on whether each meets two or more of the following criteria:

 Its value as an example of the architectural, cultural, economical, historical, social, or other aspect of the heritage of the City of Chicago, State of Illinois, or the United States;
 Its location as a site of a significant historic event which may or may not have taken place within or involved the use of any existing improvements;
 Its identification with a person or persons who significantly contributed to architectural, cultural, economic, historic, social, or other aspect of the development of the City of Chicago, State of Illinois, or the United States;
 Its exemplification of an architectural type or style distinguished by innovation, rarity, uniqueness, or overall quality of design, detail, materials or craftsmanship;
 Its identification as the work of an architect, designer, engineer, or builder whose individual work is significant in the history or development of the City of Chicago, the State of Illinois, or the United States;
 Its representation of an architectural, cultural, economic, historic, social, or other theme expressed through distinctive areas, districts, places, buildings, structures, works of art, or other objects that may or may not be contiguous;
 Its unique location or distinctive physical appearance or presence representing an established and familiar visual feature of a neighborhood, community, or the City of Chicago.

Once the commission has determined that a candidate meets at least two of the above criteria, the group may provide a preliminary landmark designation if the candidate "has a significant historic, community, architectural or aesthetic interest or value, the integrity of which is preserved in light of its location, design, setting, materials, workmanship, and ability to express such historic, community, architectural or aesthetic interest or value."

History

In Chicago, the historic preservation movement initially sought to ensure the survival of individual buildings of special significance. However, the movement has evolved to include districts and neighborhoods and even encompasses distinctive areas of the natural environment. Preservation is now an integral element of urban planning and design. Three trends led to popular support of the formalization of the movement in response to extensive and far reaching destruction of Chicago's environment:
 government-sponsored "urban renewal", which had resulted in destruction of some residential areas;
 construction of high-speed, limited-access expressways financed largely by federal highway funds, which divided neighborhoods; and
 the real estate boom in response to the demand for increased office space in the Loop.

In 1957, Chicago City Council 5th ward alderman Leon Despres began the landmark preservation movement in Chicago, by adopting the Frank Lloyd Wright Robie House. This led to the formation of the City Landmarks Commission, who chose 39 buildings as "honorary" landmarks. That body evolved into the present Commission on Chicago Landmarks which was empowered by Despres's 1968 city ordinance to select and protect 12 important buildings as the inaugural official Chicago Landmarks. Although the movement was unable to save either Louis Sullivan's Garrick Theater in 1960 or Sullivan's Chicago Stock Exchange Building in 1972, the efforts spawned the Landmarks Preservation Council of Illinois in addition to the municipal Commission.

National recognition

Many landmarks have been designated with National Historic Landmark status by the United States Secretary of the Interior for historical significance. All of those and a number of other districts, sites, buildings, structures, and objects worthy of preservation have been listed on the National Register of Historic Places. Not all Chicago Landmarks have been listed on the National Register, and not all Registered Historic Places (not even all of those that are further designated National Historic Landmarks) have been designated Chicago Landmarks. No Chicago Landmarks are classified as any other type of National Park System protected area including National Parks, National Monuments, or National Preserves. The charts below detail these designations for the city of Chicago-designated sites and the National Historic Landmarks.

List of landmarks

For consistency, the list below uses the name from the Chicago Landmark website. Neighborhood names and boundaries are consistent with the Community areas in Chicago.

Registered Historic Places and Landmarks not designated Chicago Landmarks

As noted in the list above, there are many places that are designated as City landmarks but they have not been nationally registered.  There are also approximately 200 nationally Registered Historic Places in Chicago that are not also designated Chicago Landmarks. Of these, 13 are further designated as U.S. National Historic Landmarks:

See also

National Register of Historic Places listings in Central Chicago
National Register of Historic Places listings in North Side Chicago
National Register of Historic Places listings in South Side Chicago
National Register of Historic Places listings in West Side Chicago

References
Notes

External links

 City of Chicago: Chicago Landmarks Listings
 City of Chicago: Commission on Chicago Landmarks
 Chicago Cultural Commission plaque program

Landmarks

Locally designated landmarks in the United States
Lists of landmarks